Porocyphus is a genus of fungi within the family Lichinaceae. The genus contains eight species.

Species
 Porocyphus byssoides
 Porocyphus coccodes
 Porocyphus dimorphus
 Porocyphus kenmorensis 
 Porocyphus leptogiella
 Porocyphus rehmicus
 Porocyphus riparius

References

External links
Porocyphus at Index Fungorum

Lichinomycetes
Lichen genera
Taxa named by Gustav Wilhelm Körber